Kayla Danielle Mills (born November 8, 1995) is an American soccer player who plays for GPSO 92 Issy in the Division 1 Féminine in France.

Career
Mills spent her college soccer career at USC where she played from 2013 to 2016. She was part of the team in 2016 that won the NCAA National Championship.

Mills was drafted by Sky Blue FC with the 4th overall pick in the 2017 NWSL College Draft. She appeared in 16 games in 2017, starting 13 of them. Mills was named to Sky Blue FC's 2018 roster. She was released by Sky Blue on June 15, 2018, to make room on the roster for Imani Dorsey. Mills did not appear in a game for Sky Blue in 2018.

After being released by Sky Blue, Mills signed with CSFA Ambilly in the D2, in France. She made her debut for the team on September 23, 2018. At the end of the season 2019-2020 stopped before the end by COVID-19, she signed with another French Team, FF Issy, promoted in D1

Personal life
Mills is a native of West Covina, California, and attended Flintridge Sacred Heart Academy. She majored in communication at the University of Southern California.

References

External links
 
 USC bio
 Illinois State bio

1995 births
Living people
American women's soccer players
United States women's under-20 international soccer players
Sportspeople from West Covina, California
Soccer players from California
USC Trojans women's soccer players
NJ/NY Gotham FC draft picks
NJ/NY Gotham FC players
National Women's Soccer League players
Women's association football defenders
GPSO 92 Issy players
American expatriate women's soccer players
American expatriate sportspeople in France
Expatriate women's footballers in France